Markus Ganahl (born 12 February 1975 in Vaduz) is a Liechtensteiner former alpine skier who competed in the 2002 Winter Olympics.

External links
 sports-reference.com
 

1975 births
Living people
Liechtenstein male alpine skiers
Olympic alpine skiers of Liechtenstein
Alpine skiers at the 2002 Winter Olympics
People from Vaduz
21st-century Liechtenstein people